John Enebrook (died 1415) was the member of Parliament for the constituency of Dover for the parliament of 1399.

References 

Members of the Parliament of England for Dover
Year of birth unknown
English MPs 1399
1415 deaths